The 2011 BRD Năstase Țiriac Trophy was a tennis tournament played on outdoor clay courts. It was the 19th edition of the BRD Năstase Țiriac Trophy tournament, and was part of the ATP World Tour 250 Series of the 2011 ATP World Tour. It was held in Bucharest, Romania, 17–23 September 2011.

Entrants

Seeds

 1 Rankings are as of 12 September 2011.

Other entrants
The following players received wildcards into the singles main draw:
  Marius Copil
  Victor Crivoi
  Adrian Ungur

The following players received entry from the qualifying draw:

  Alessandro Giannessi
  Gianluca Naso
  Florent Serra
  Peter Torebko

Finals

Singles

 Florian Mayer defeated  Pablo Andújar, 6–3, 6–1
It was Mayer's 1st career title.

Doubles

 Daniele Bracciali /  Potito Starace defeated  Julian Knowle /  David Marrero, 3–6, 6–4, [10–8].

External links
Official website

BRD Nastase Tiriac Trophy
Romanian Open
2011 in Romanian tennis
September 2011 sports events in Romania